Indonesian Academy of Sciences ( (AIPI)) is an independent "nonstructural" Indonesian institution that was formally regulated and established in 1990, formed in 1956 as Majelis Ilmu Pengetahuan Indonesia (MIPI) then restructured in 1967 to become Lembaga Ilmu Pengetahuan Indonesia (LIPI), to assemble leading Indonesian scientists for the purposes of giving opinions, suggestions, and considerations on their own initiatives and/or requests regarding the mastery, development, and utilization of science and technology for the national government and its citizen.

External links 
 

Scientific organizations based in Indonesia
National academies of sciences